Inglefield Land is an unglaciated area along the northwestern coast of Greenland. It was named after English explorer Edward Augustus Inglefield.

History
Inglefield Land is noted for its archaeological sites, which show evidence of occupation by the Dorset Culture and Thule Culture.

Geography
The region stretches from Cape Alexander to the southwest to Cape Agassiz at the eastern end. It is bounded by Prudhoe Land in the south, the Humboldt Glacier in the northeast, and the Kane Basin to the north. The Dodge Glacier is located to the southwest and the Hiawatha Glacier to the east. The McGary and Bonsall Islands are located off the northeastern and the Littleton Islands of the southwestern end.

References

Geography of Greenland